Glycine decarboxylase also known as glycine cleavage system P protein or glycine dehydrogenase is an enzyme that in humans is encoded by the GLDC gene.

Reaction 

Glycine decarboxylase is an enzyme that catalyzes the following chemical reaction:

glycine + H-protein-lipoyllysine  H-protein-S-aminomethyldihydrolipoyllysine + CO2

Thus, the two substrates of this enzyme are glycine and H-protein-lipoyllysine, whereas its two products are H-protein-S-aminomethyldihydrolipoyllysine and CO2.

This enzyme belongs to the family of oxidoreductases, specifically those acting on the CH-NH2 group of donors with a disulfide as acceptor.   This enzyme participates in glycine, serine and threonine metabolism.  It employs one cofactor, pyridoxal phosphate.

Function 

Glycine decarboxylase is the P-protein of the glycine cleavage system in eukaryotes.  The glycine cleavage system catalyzes the degradation of glycine. The P protein binds the alpha-amino group of glycine through its pyridoxal phosphate cofactor. Carbon dioxide is released and the remaining methylamine moiety is then transferred to the lipoamide cofactor of the H protein.

Degradation of glycine is brought about by the glycine cleavage system, which is composed of four mitochondrial protein components: P protein (a pyridoxal phosphate-dependent glycine decarboxylase), H protein (a lipoic acid-containing protein), T protein (a tetrahydrofolate-requiring enzyme), and L protein (a lipoamide dehydrogenase).

Clinical significance 

Glycine encephalopathy is due to defects in GLDC or AMT of the glycine cleavage system.

References

Further reading

 
 
 *

EC 1.4.4
Pyridoxal phosphate enzymes
Enzymes of known structure